Maryam Achak (born 4 February 1947) is an Iranian fencer. She competed in the women's team foil event at the 1976 Summer Olympics.

References

External links
 

1947 births
Living people
Iranian female foil fencers
Olympic fencers of Iran
Fencers at the 1976 Summer Olympics
Asian Games gold medalists for Iran
Asian Games medalists in fencing
Fencers at the 1974 Asian Games
Medalists at the 1974 Asian Games
20th-century Iranian women
21st-century Iranian women